Philopotamus montanus, common name yellow spotted sedge,  is a species of caddisfly belonging to the family Philopotamidae.

Subspecies
Subspecies include: 
Philopotamus montanus arvernicus F. Vaillant, 1974
Philopotamus montanus caurelensis Gonzalez & Terra, 1979
Philopotamus montanus cesareus McLachlan, 1884
Philopotamus montanus chrysopterus Morton, 1884Philopotamus montanus insularis R. McLachlan, 1878Philopotamus montanus montanus (Donovan, 1813)Philopotamus montanus perversus McLachlan, 1884Philopotamus montanus pyrenaicus McLachlan, 1878Philopotamus montanus scoticus McLachlan, 1862Philopotamus montanus siculus H.A. Hagen, 1860

Distribution and habitat
This species is native to Europe. It extends over whole Europe eastwards to Northwestern and Northern Russia. Fauna europaea  The aquatic stages of Philopotamus montanus can be found mainly in small rivers in uplands, in brooks and rivulets and in stony streams, often with rapids, as this species prefers high current velocities. 

These medium sized caddisflies are usually light brown or yellowish colored, with many dark brown spots.

BiologyPhilopotamus montanus'' has one generation a year (univoltine). Larvae build long, tubular nets attached to rocks.  They are filter-feeders, mainly feeding on small, particulate matter, fine particles and diatoms. Adults of these caddisflies are on the wing from February to October.

Bibliography
Barnard, P. and Ross, E. (2012) The Adult Trichoptera (Caddisflies) of Britain and Ireland. RES Handbook Volume 1, Part 17.
Botosaneanu L., Cianficconi F., Moretti G.P., 1986 - Autumnal aspects of the caddisfly fauna (Trichoptera) of Sicily, with description of a remarkable relict species. Mitteil. Entom. Gesell. Basel, 36: 145-154.
Botosaneanu L., Schmid F., 1973 - Les Trichoptères du Muséum d'Histoire Naturelle de Genève. Revue Suisse de Zoologie, 80(1): 221-256.
Edington, J.M. and Hildrew, A.G. (1995) A Revised Key to the Caseless Caddis Larvae of the British Isles: with notes on their ecology. Freshwater Biological Association Special Publication No. 53.
Graf, W., Murphy, J., Dahl, J., Zamora-Muñoz, C. and López-Rodríguez, M.J. (2008) Distribution and Ecological Preferences of European Freshwater Species. Volume 1: Trichoptera. Astrid Schmidt-Kloiber & Daniel Hering (eds). Pensoft, Sofia-Moscow.
O’Connor, J.P. (2015) A Catalogue and Atlas of the Caddisflies (Trichoptera) of Ireland. Occasional Publication of the Irish Biogeographical Society, No. 11.

External links
 Evasion
 Electronic Keys
 Inatutalist

References

Trichoptera